Rafael Pacchiano Alamán (born 4 November 1975) is a Mexican politician from the Ecologist Green Party of Mexico who is the current Secretary of Environment and Natural Resources of Mexico. From 2009 to 2012 he served as Deputy of the LXI Legislature of the Mexican Congress representing Querétaro.

Pacchiano Alamán was the Secretary of the Environment (SEMARNAT) under President Enrique Peña Nieto from August 27, 2015 to November 30, 2018.

References

1975 births
Living people
Politicians from Querétaro
Members of the Chamber of Deputies (Mexico)
Ecologist Green Party of Mexico politicians
Mexican Secretaries of the Environment
21st-century Mexican politicians
Monterrey Institute of Technology and Higher Education alumni